Palpita sejunctalis is a moth in the family Crambidae. It was described by Inoue in 1997. It is found in China (Zhejiang, Fujian, Guangdong), Taiwan, Vietnam, Malaysia and Myanmar.

References

Moths described in 1997
Palpita
Moths of Asia